Route 199 is an  north–south highway located on the Magdalen Islands, in the Gulf of Saint Lawrence. Stretching from Les Îles-de-la-Madeleine's communities of L'Île-du-Havre-Aubert to Grande-Entrée, the route is the main artery of the archipelago and is the only Quebec numbered highway that is detached from the rest of the network.

Municipalities along Route 199
 Les Îles-de-la-Madeleine (L'Île-du-Havre-Aubert / L'Étang-du-Nord / Cap-aux-Meules / Fatima / Havre-aux-Maisons / Pointe-aux-Loups)
 Grosse-Île
 Les Îles-de-la-Madeleine (Grande-Entrée)

See also
 List of Quebec provincial highways

References

External links 
 Provincial Route Map (Courtesy of the Quebec Ministry of Transportation) 
 Route 199 on Google Maps

199
Magdalen Islands
Roads in Gaspésie–Îles-de-la-Madeleine